Wayne Ruediger (born 15 August 1976) is an Australian international lawn bowler.

Bowls career
Ruediger won the gold medal in the triples with Aron Sherriff, Mark Casey and Brett Wilkie during the 2012 World Outdoor Bowls Championship in Adelaide.

He competed in the men's fours at the 2014 Commonwealth Games where he won a bronze medal.

He won two medals at the 2015 Asia Pacific Bowls Championships in Christchurch.

References

1976 births
Living people
Bowls players at the 2014 Commonwealth Games
Commonwealth Games bronze medallists for Australia
Australian male bowls players
Commonwealth Games medallists in lawn bowls
Bowls World Champions
Medallists at the 2014 Commonwealth Games